Patty Hou (born 20 December 1977) is a Taiwanese former news anchor. She has subsequently hosted an entertainment program on Azio TV and published the book Patty's About Love.

Career
Hou was born in Taipei, Taiwan, she graduated with a degree in mass communications and psychology from the University of Southern California. She was a news anchor for TTV, Era News and CTi before resigning in 2004 and venturing into the entertainment scene.

Hou is currently an anchor at Azio TV for Entertainment in Asia (every weekday, 19:00-20:00) and for fashion news at Eranews (Saturdays, 12:00-12:30). She is also the spokeswoman for DHC cosmetics. She has also hosted the Star Awards, Singapore's Chinese language television awards, twice and the 2009 concert Huaren • Night in Phoenix City Concert. She continues to host her weekly show, "Entertainment Asia". Hou has also starred in several Taiwan and mainland China television series.

Works

Experience
 2001: Trainee reporter at Taiwan Television (TTV).
 2002: English news anchor at CTi TV.
 2003: the anchor of Era News
 2004–2005: the anchor of ERA News and ERA Fashion News, AZIO TV's Entertainment-News@Asia anchor, and the Editor of Patty's about magazine book.
 2005: Host with Matilda Tao and ChiLing, Lin for the 16th Golden Melody Award at Kaohsiung, Taiwan.
 2005: Host with Guo Liang for the 2005 Star Awards in Singapore.
 2006: Host with Guo Liang for the 2006 Star Awards in Singapore.
She participated in the dubbing of Taiwanese Mandarin version of the film Flushed Away, as the character of Rita.
 2007: Host with Matilda Tao for the 18th Golden Melody Award at Taipei Arena, Taiwan.

TV series
 2007: Sweet Relationship 美味關係 as Chung Bai Hui
 2010: Love Buffet 愛似百匯 Ai Si Bai Hui as 穎芝 Ying Zhi （特別演出/ Special Performance）
 2011-2012: Guess 你猜你猜你猜猜猜 Guess Guess Guess with Jacky Wu

References

External links

 Patty Hou's Official Vlog

1977 births
Living people
Writers from Taipei
Taiwanese television news anchors
Taiwanese television personalities
University of Southern California alumni
Taiwanese women writers
American writers of Taiwanese descent
Taiwanese emigrants to the United States
American women television journalists
21st-century American women